James Michael Clampitt (born February 17, 1955) is an American politician. He was elected to the North Carolina House of Representatives in 2016 and 2020. Before his election in 2016, he ran unsuccessfully for office for Swain County Board of Commissioners in both 2006 and 2010, and the North Carolina House of Representatives in 2012 and 2014. A Republican, he serves the 119th district, covering portions of Haywood, Jackson, and Swain counties. He was a captain in the Charlotte Fire Department from 1977 to 2004. He is a resident of Bryson City.

Honors

In 2018, Clampitt received a 90% rating on the NC Values Coalition Legislative Scorecard.

During the 2018 general assembly session, Clampitt was one of the only Republican members of the House of Representatives to cosponsor Democratic Governor Roy Cooper's Budget.

Involvement with the Oath Keepers

In late September 2021, it was revealed that Clampitt's name was among the some 38,000 people whose names appear on a membership roster of the Oath Keepers; a far-right anti-government militia, following a hack of the group's internal data. Records show that Clampitt has been on the Oath Keepers' roster since at least 2014. Clampitt is also a registered member of the Sons of Confederate Veterans.

References

External links

|-

Living people
People from Swain County, North Carolina
People from Bryson City, North Carolina
Republican Party members of the North Carolina House of Representatives
1955 births
21st-century American politicians
Members of Sons of Confederate Veterans